It Happened All Night (in French: Affaire d'une nuit) is a 1960 French film directed by Henri Verneuil, starring Pascale Petit, Roger Hanin, Pierre Mondy and with the participation of Brigitte Bardot.

Cast
 Pascale Petit : Christine Fiesco  
 Roger Hanin : Michel Ferréol  
 Pierre Mondy : Antoine Fiesco  
 Robert Dalban : Lenormand  
 Gabriel Gobin : Sergeant
 Émile Genevois : drunkard  
 Micheline Luccioni : Mireille Luccioni  
 Bernard Musson : pharmacist    
 Claude Piéplu : salesman  
 Gisèle Préville : Madame Lenormand  
 Brigitte Bardot : a woman in the restaurant (uncredited)  
 Jacques Charrier : a man in the restaurant (uncredited)
 Henri Verneuil : a man in the restaurant (uncredited)
 Christine Gouze-Rénal : a woman in the restaurant (uncredited)  
 Guy Henry : librarian (uncredited)  
 Félix Marten : a man in the restaurant (uncredited)  
 Darío Moreno : himself (uncredited)

References

External links
 

1960s French-language films
1960 films
French comedy films
1960s French films